Belter Creole, also simply known as Belter, is a constructed language developed by the linguist and polyglot Nick Farmer for The Expanse television series. In the universe, it was spoken by Belters, inhabitants of the asteroid belt and outer planets of the Solar System.

Farmer was commissioned to create the language during the productions of the first season of the show, between 2014 and 2015. While developing the language, he had modeled it as a creole based on English, with influence of other languages from all around the world, including Romance languages such as Spanish, French, Portuguese and Italian, Germanic languages such as German, Dutch and Swedish, Slavic languages such as Polish, Russian and Ukrainian, as well as Japanese, Chinese, Persian, Arabic, Hebrew, Zulu and others. As the result of his work, Farmer had created over 1000 words for his language, adding more to the list if requested by the show's producers and fans.

Development 
The concept of the language had appeared for the first time in the book Leviathan Wakes (2011), the first book in The Expanse series, published under the pen name James S. A. Corey that has been used by the collaborators Daniel Abraham and Ty Franck. Following that, Belter Creole continued to appear in the subsequent books in the series. The language presented in the books greatly varied from the one later developed by Nick Farmer. It lacked developed vocabulary as well as grammar, phonological, and orthographic systems. It was a mix of words taken from various languages and was mostly presented as a dialect mixed in the English dialogue, "to give the reader a sense of being excluded from this culture".

The vocabulary used in the books was chosen by the authors on the basis of aesthetics and was not originally intended to form a real language. As the language was later developed for The Expanse television series, novel writers had discouraged fans from learning their version of the language in favor of the television one.

Nick Farmer, a linguist and a polyglot, was commissioned to develop the constructed language for the television series, during the production of its first season between 2014 and 2015. Farmer was recommended for the job by Ty Franck, a co-author of the series of books that the TV series was based on, as both had worked together before.

Inside the universe of The Expanse, which is set around 200 years in the future, the language is used by Belters, the inhabitants of the asteroid belt and outer planets of the Solar System. The language had developed during the colonization of the Asteroid Belt, firstly starting as the pidgin spoken by people who came to the colonies from Earth speaking in various languages from all around the world. With next generations, the language had developed into the creole. The language had various dialects and accents, that would vary from one location to another. According to Farmer, the vocabulary and grammar rules, present in the show, and revealed by the author himself, were a dialect used on Ceres.

Developing the language, Farmer had modeled it as a creole based on English, with influence of other languages from all around the world, including Romance languages such as Spanish, French, Portuguese, and Italian, Germanic languages such as German, Dutch, and Swedish, Slavic languages such as Polish, Russian, and Ukrainian, as well as Japanese, Chinese, Persian, Hindi, Arabic, Hebrew, Zulu, and others. As the result of his work, Farmer had created over 1000 words for his language, adding more to the list if requested by show's producers and fans.

The pronunciation of the language was developed by Nick Farmer and Eric Armstrong, a dialect coach. During development, they came to the conclusion that the language's pronunciation and tone had become too similar to that of Jamaican English. As a result, Armstrong suggested that Farmer make various modifications to the phonological, morphological, and lexicological characteristics, such that the language's overall sound gave an impression that it derived via an amalgamation of several existent languages and cultures of a near-future, globalized working-class population.  They accomplished this goal by fusing together various elements of multiple real-world cants, dialects, and accents to form distinct types of Belter drawls or sounds and then encouraged the actors to choose one which fit their character. Additionally, the producers were advised to deliberately create a cast of actors and actresses who spoke in varying accent types so as to illustrate real-world concepts observed in societies and cultures where creole and pidgin languages are spoken. For example, actors Dominique Tipper and Cara Gee would introduce to the show the concepts of code switching and English spoken as a second language as paradigms of Belter Creole and culture.

The show's producers had emphasized that they did not want to use subtitles for Lang Belta, but rather wanted the audience to be capable of dialogue comprehension via recognizable phonological similarities to English words/phrases and contextual inference. Due to that, for most of its appearances, the language was presented only as various words mixed in the English dialogue. During the show production, Farmer would always make 3 versions of the lines for the script, one entirely in the Belter, one with medium Belter influence, and one with light usage of the Belter. Then, actors would learn and shoot all 3 variants of the scenes, after that, the producers would choose which version they wanted to use.

The language had appeared for the first time in "Dulcinea", the pilot episode of The Expanse, that premiered in 2015, and since then has been regularly appearing in the show throughout its 6 seasons. Since the production of the pilot, looping voice actors were taught belter language by Armstrong.

As the language gained popularity, Nick Farmer had started regularly revealing new words and grammar functions on his Twitter account. He also had given language lessons to the fans during meet-ups.

Phonology

Orthography and pronunciation 
According to language creator, Nick Farmer, in the universe of The Expanse, there's no standardized orthography of the language; variants are used in different parts of the asteroid belt and the outer planets. Additionally, although all Farmer's posts, and language appearances in the TV series, are written in the Latin script, according to Farmer, Belter Creole can also be written with other writing systems.

Standard alphabet used by Nick Farmer to write down Belter Creole in TV series script and his Twitter posts include 24 letters of Latin script. The aforementioned letters are:

Additionally, Farmer's script include 5 digraphs that are: Ch, Ng, Ny, Ow, and Sh, as well as one trigraph, which is Dzh. Letters C and H are present only in the digraphs Ch and Sh, and in trigraph Dzh, while J and Q, are present only in the loanwords. As an exception, the letter C is sometimes used in place of K, for example in words such as copeng ("friend") and condenashang ("condemnation"), which usually are spelled, respectively, as kopeng and kondenashang.

Farmer also uses the turned alpha (capital: Ɒ, lowercase: ɒ), as an alternative spelling of the digraph Ow, which is used to represent the open back rounded vowel sound. For example, the alternative spelling of the word owkwa ("water"), would be ɒkwa.

The acute accent placed above the letters A, E, O and U is used to indicate different than usual stress  in the word pronunciation. Example of such are Á in ámolof (/'æmo.lof/) which means love, É in idzhifobék (/id͡ʒi.fo'bek/) which means weak, Ó in belówt (/be'lɒt/) which means blood, and Ú in gútegow (/'gut.te.gɒ/) which means ready.

The tilde placed above the letters A and E is used to indicate the nasal vowel. Examples of such are Ã, pronounced as [æn], for example in shãsa ("chance"), and Ẽ, pronounced as [en] sound, for example in Kẽdzhi, Belter rendition of the name Kenji. Such letters are rarely present in spelling, with their role usually fulfilled by an and en.

Epenthesis and elision 
When forming compounds, epenthetic vowels are sometimes added to the words. Such vowels are a and, less commonly, e. Examples of such changes are:
 bek + da + bush → bekedabúsh
 na + kang + pensa → nakangepensa
 tung + ting → túngeting
 im + lowda → imalowda

Consonants at the morpheme boundary can be also elided instead. Examples of such changes are:
 kowl + mang → kowmang
 zakong + mang → zákomang

Stress 
In most cases the primary stress falls on the penultimate syllable of a word. For example, in:
 showxa (/'ʃɒ.xæ/)
 seteshang (/se'te.ʃæŋ/)
 gufovedi (/gu.fo've.di/)

If the stress for a particular word is on a different syllable, this is indicated with an addition of the acute accent above the letters A, E, O and U. Examples of such words are:
 ámolof (/'æ.mo.lof/)
 idzhifobék (/id͡ʒi.fo'bek/)
 belówt (/be'lɒt/)

When forming compound words, the stress often remains on the head of the compound, which sometimes requires the addition of an accent mark:
 zakong (/'za.koŋ/) → zákomang (/'zako.mæŋ/)
 gut (/gut/) → gútegow (/'gut.t.egɒ/)
 tung (/tuŋ/) → túngeting (/'tuŋ.e.tiŋ/)

Grammar

Nouns and adjectives
Nouns do not specify the quantity of the objects and do not have different versions for singular and plural versions. For example, mang can mean both a person and people. The quantity is instead determined by the presence of the quantifiers, numerals, or inferred from context. For example wang mang means one person and tu mang means two people The exception are the pronouns, which have both singular and plural forms.

Nouns may be used attributively to modify other nouns, forming a compound noun. Unlike in English, where the modifier typically precedes the word being modified, in Belter the head noun goes first and the one modifying it follows afterward. For example, diye beref, which mean birthday, is formed from the words diye, meaning day, and beref, meaning birth.

Adjectives are placed after the nouns they modify, for example in: setara mali, which means little star.

Verbs 
Many verbs can be formed from nouns, by adding du, meaning to do, and to make, in front of the noun. For example, by adding du, in front of noun ámolof, which means love, will form du ámolof, which means to love. However, adding du, is only required for the verbs that would otherwise function as nouns. For the contrast, verb beve, means to drink. Additionally, in a few cases, adding the prefix du-, in front of a verb, can change its meaning. For example, adding it to verb sensa, which means to feel, will transform it into du-sensa, which means to apologize.

Articles 
Belter Creole has 2 articles, indefinite wa, which corresponds to English a and an, and definite da, which corresponds to English the.

An indefinite article wa is used to mark an indefinite noun phrase. Indefinite articles are those, which do not refer to a specific identifiable entity. For example, in the sentence: tenye wa diye beref gut, which means have a happy birthday.

A defined article da is used to mark a definite noun phrase. Definite articles are used to refer to a particular member of a group. For example, in the sentence: kepelésh da seteshang?, which means where is the station?. When a noun is marked with da, any attributive nouns or adjectives applied to that noun must also be so marked with it. For example, in the sentence: da setara da mali, which means the little star. The definite article is also sometimes also used before a person's name, for example da Naomi for name Naomi.

Pronouns
The language has 2 sets of 3 pronouns, each having singular and plural forms. All pronouns in the Belter are gender-neutral. Plural pronouns are formed by adding the suffix -lowda to singular pronouns.

Tenses and aspects 
The language has 3 basic tenses which are the past, the present, and the future. Sentences without tense indicators are in the present tense. For example: mi showxa, which means I speak. The past tense is indicated by adding ta after the pronoun. For example: mi ta showxa, which means I spoke. The future tense is indicated by adding gonya after the pronoun. For example: mi gonya showxa, which means I will speak.

It also has 3 grammatical aspects, which are the continuous, the habitual, and the perfective. The continuous aspect specifies incomplete action or state in progress at a specific time. It is indicated by adding ando after the pronoun. For example: mi ando showxa, which means I am speaking. The habitual aspect specifies an action as occurring habitually. It is indicated by adding tili after the pronoun. For example: mi tili showxa, which means I regularly speak. The perfective aspect specifies an action viewed as a simple whole. It is indicated by adding finyish after the pronoun. For example, mi finyish showxa, which means I have/had spoken.

When indicators of both tense and aspect are present in the sentence, the tense indicator is put before the aspect's one. For example: mi ta ando showxa, which means, I was speaking.

Sentence structure 
The sentence structure of Belter Creole is subject–verb–object, which means that the subject comes first, the verb second, and the object third. It also has the zero copula, the phenomenon where the subject is joined to the predicate without overt marking of this relationship. For example, in the sentence: mi nadzhush, which means, I am tired, but in the literal translation would mean I tired.

Forming questions 
The questions are formed by adding the word ke at the end of the statement sentence. For example, the sentence "To showxa lang Belta", which means You speak Belter Creole, after transforming it into the "To showxa lang Belta, ke?", will mean "Do you speak Belter Creole?".

When asking a question, on which both speakers agree, keyá, meaning isn't it, is used instead. For example, sentence "To showxa lang Belta, keyá?" means "You speak Belter Creole, don't you?".

The questions containing interrogatives do not require the addition of the word ke. Aforementioned words are:
 kemang = who
 kepelésh = where
 ketim = when
 keting = what
 kewe = how
 kéweting = what kind/type
 kéradzhang = why, for what reason
 kédawang = which
 kelowda = how many/much

An example of such sentence is "Kepelésh shapu to?" which means "Where's your hat?".

Vocabulary

Example words

Numbers 

Numbers with values in both tens and ones are formed by combining ones number with tens number, and joining them with affix -un-. For example:
 18 = et-un-teng ("eight and ten")
 81 = wang-un-éteteng ("one and eight tens")

When forming a number with hundreds place, the hundreds number is placed at the beginning of the number, then followed by the one and ten numbers format. For example:
 281 = túxanya wang-un-éteteng ("two hundred one and eight tens")

When used attributively, numbers come before the noun they count, for example in the sentence serí buk, which means three books.

Novel language 
The concept of the language had appeared for the first time in the 2011 book Leviathan Wakes, published under the pen name James S. A. Corey, used by the collaborators Daniel Abraham and Ty Franck. Following that, Belter Creole had appeared in the next books from The Expanse series. The language presented in the books greatly varied from the one later developed by Nick Farmer. It lacked developed vocabulary as well as grammar, phonological and orthographic systems. It was a mix of words taken from various languages and was mostly presented as a dialect mixed in the English dialogue. The vocabulary used in the books was chosen by authors on the basis of aesthetics and wasn't supposed to form a real language. The languages used as a basis of the language vocabulary include: English, Spanish, German, Portuguese, Estonian, Esperanto, French, Korean, Chinese, Hungarian, Japanese, Polish, Dutch, Arabic, Catalan, Italian, Serbo-Croatian, Russian, Turkish. Authors kept the original spellings of borrowed words or made a modified version of them. The language was inconsistent and on many occasions used different words for the same meaning. For example, words laa and la from Arabic لا (laa, meaning no), na from English nah and ne from Serbo-Croatian ne/не, all meant no, while both gato from Japanese ありがとう (arigatō) and aituma from Estonian  aitäh ment thank you.

As the language was later developed for The Expanse television series, novel writers had discouraged fans from learning their version of the language in favor of the television one. Though the novel and television versions of the language are meant to not be related, some words from the novel version appear in the television version, for example both novel sa-sa and television sasa mean to know.

In popular culture 
A few songs were written in Belter Creole, which include covers of the "Tighten Up", "Highway Star", and "All by Myself", renamed to "I'm All Alone". The covers were commissioned for The Expanse television series and had their lyrics adjusted to fit the Expanse universe setting and rewritten in the mix of Belter Creole and English. The song respectively were used in the first and third seasons of the show, premiering in 2015 and 2018. The full versions of the songs were later placed on The Collector's Edition version of the TV series soundtrack, which was realized on 13 December 2019.

The cover of "Tighten Up", originally by The Black Keys, was performed by Justin Young. It was used in the first episode of the first season, titled "Dulcinea", that had premiered in 2015.

The cover of the "Highway Star", originally by Deep Purple, was performed by Cory Todd. Additionally, as the song was adjusted to the setting of the universe, the references to the car from the original song were replaced with the spaceship. The cover of "All by Myself", originally by Eric Carmen, was renamed to "I'm All Alone", and performed by Ghian Wright. Both songs were used in the episode of the third season, titled "Delta-V", that had premiered in 2018.

Additionally, the song "Seteshang Anderson" by The Moldy Filters, and written by Pirate, has lyrics written in Belter Creole. It was released on 13 April 2019. The song's melody was based on "The Chemical Worker's Song (Process Man)" by Great Big Sea. It focuses on the fictionalized difficulties of lives of Belter workers, under the regime of Earth and Mars, as well as the events of protests on the titular Anderson Station, which were featured in the 2011 science fiction short novel The Butcher of Anderson Station by James S. A. Corey, and later, in 2015 episode "Back to the Butcher" of The Expanse series.

In January 2022, Twitter accounts of space agencies NASA and ESA posted in Belter Creole.

Sample text 
Article 1 of the Universal Declaration of Human Rights in Belter Creole:
Kowl mang fong beref im im ferí unte eka [...]. Imalowda pensa unte sensa we gut unte we mal. Unte im mogut fo manting du wit sif asilik beratna unte sésata.

Article 1 of the Universal Declaration of Human Rights in English:
All human beings are born free and equal [...]. They are  endowed with reason and conscience and should act towards one another in a spirit of brotherhood.

External links 
 Belter Creole on Wiktionary

Citations

Notes

References 

Constructed languages
Artistic languages
Fictional languages
Future dialects
Constructed languages introduced in the 2010s
2011 introductions
Fictional elements introduced in 2015
Subject–verb–object languages
English-based pidgins and creoles
The Expanse